Slowinski's rat snake (Pantherophis emoryi slowinskii) is a subspecies of nonvenomous snake in the family Colubridae. The subspecies is indigenous to Louisiana, eastern Texas, and Arkansas.

Classification
Pantherophis emoryi slowinskii was long considered an intergrade of the corn snake (Pantherophis guttata) and the Great Plains rat snake (Pantherophis emoryi), but in 2002 it was elevated to species status and named to honor the memory of American herpetologist Joseph Bruno Slowinski. These three sister-species are probably best identified in Arkansas by simply consulting a range map, given that their ranges in the state do not overlap.

Description
Slowinski's corn snake is medium-sized and colored grayish-brown, with a series of large, alternating, chocolate-brown blotches. These blotches are often bordered in black. It has a spearhead marking on the head. The belly is checkered black and white, giving it an appearance of maize (its close relative, the corn snake, is believed to have gotten its name for this belly pattern).

While this subspecies resembles superficially the prairie kingsnake (Lampropeltis calligaster), the spearhead marking present on the head of Slowinski's corn snake is usually sufficient for identification. Its body has a rounded top, steep sides, and a flat belly.

The young of this subspecies can be distinguished from those of the western rat snake (Pantherophis obsoletus) by considering the dark bar that runs through each eye. In Slowinski's corn snake, this bar extends through the jawline and onto the neck, whereas in the western rat snake the bar extends only to the jawline where it stops abruptly.

Behavior
This subspecies, Pantherophis emoryi slowinskii, is nocturnal and quite secretive. Like its sister-species, the Great Plains rat snake (Pantherophis emoryi), it is an excellent climber and likely spends a large portion of its time up in trees. These habits together may explain why it is so infrequently encountered by humans. Its nocturnal tendencies may also help it avoid dangers, such as day-foraging hawks.

Slowinski's corn snake is likely similar in temperament to its sister-species, the Great Plains rat snake, which is very tame. Slowinski's corn snake relies mainly on camouflage for defense and rarely bites.

This species feeds primarily on small mammals and birds. Prey, when caught, is constricted and consumed. Presumably, it follows an activity pattern similar to other rat snakes: hibernate through winter, breed in the spring, and lay eggs in the summer.

Distribution and abundance
The abundance of the species P. emoryi slowinskii is largely unknown. The lack of voucher specimens from Arkansas seems to indicate that it is extremely rare in that state, being known only from isolated localities in the southeastern part. Trauth et al. indicate only a single locality in the state, Drew County.

References

Bibliography
Behler JL, King FW (1987). The Audubon Society Field Guide to North American Reptiles and Amphibians. 3rd ed. New York: Alfred A. Knopf. 743 pp.
Conant R, Collins JT (1998). A Field Guide to Reptiles and Amphibians of Eastern and Central North America. 3rd ed., Expanded. Boston: Houghton Mifflin Co. 616 pp.
Irwin KJ (2004). Arkansas Snake Guide. Little Rock: Arkansas Game and Fish Commission. 50 pp.
Jiang ZJ, Castoe TA, Austin CC, Burbrink FT, Herron MD, McGuire JA, Parkinson CL, Pollock DD (2007). "Comparative mitochondrial genomics of snakes: extraordinary substitution rate dynamics and functionality of the duplicate control region". BMC Evolutionary Biology 7: 123. (Pantherophis slowinskii, new combination).
Trauth SE, Robison HW, Plummer MV (2004). Amphibians and Reptiles of Arkansas. Fayetteville: University of Arkansas Press. 421 pp. .

Slowinski's corn
Slowinski's corn snake
Reptiles of the United States
Endemic fauna of the United States
Fauna of the Plains-Midwest (United States)
Fauna of the Great Plains
Slowinski's corn snake
Reptiles described in 2002